Naratheinkha (1141–1174) was king of Pagan dynasty of Burma (Myanmar) from 1171 to 1174. He appointed his brother Narapati Sithu heir apparent and commander-in-chief. It was the first recorded instance in the history of the dynasty that the king had given up the command of the army. The king was assassinated by Aungzwa, one of Sithu's servants, after the king had raised one of Sithu's wives to queen.

According to G.H. Luce, there is no inscriptional evidence that Naratheinkha or any kings between 1165 and 1174 ever existed. Other historians such as Htin Aung do not agree with Luce's "conjecture".

Early life
Naratheinkha was the eldest son of Narathu and Queen Myauk Pyinthe. Chronicles do not agree on his date of birth. The table below lists the dates given by the four main chronicles. Scholarship provisionally accepts the birth date as given in Zata's horoscopes section.

Naratheinkha grew up at the court of King Sithu I. He was not even in the line of succession as the heir apparent was his uncle Min Shin Saw. When he reached manhood, he married his second cousin Min Aung Myat, who like him was a grandchild of King Sithu I in marriage ceremony presided by the king himself.

In 1167, Naratheinkha suddenly became the heir apparent to the throne after his father assassinated both Sithu I and Min Shin Saw.

Reign

Naratheinkha came to power in 1171 after his father was killed by the assassins sent by the king of Pateikkaya, an Indian kingdom in the west. At accession, he made his brother Narapati Sithu the heir apparent and commander in chief. This was a significant change because it was the first recorded instance in the history of the dynasty that the king had given up the command of the army. Even a weak king like Saw Lu never gave up the command. He assumed the regnal name "Śrī Tribhuvanāditya Pavaradhammarāja Dānapati" (ၐြီတြိဘုဝနာဒိတျပဝရဓမ္မရာဇဒါနပတိ).

During his reign, a group of Burmese monks who had visited Sri Lanka, led by Shin Uttarajiva, returned to Bagan refusing to accept the validity of the Shin Arahan derived Kanchipuram-Thaton school, creating a schism. Naratheinkha supported the new school and sent numerous monks to be re-ordained in Sri Lanka, however, the old order and the schims would last another two centuries.

The new king was popular but his downfall soon came, according to the chronicles, due to his interest in Weluwaddy, a queen of Sithu. The king actually passed over marrying her but regretted the decision later after his brother took her. In 1174, Naratheinkha made up an excuse to send Sithu to the front in the far north at Ngasaunggyan (present-day Yunnan) to suppress a supposed rebellion. When he had confirmed that Sithu's army was at a distant fort, the king raised his sister-in-law to queen.

On his way to the frontier, Sithu got hold of the news by a messenger on horseback. Knowing he had been misled, Sithu then selected Aung Zwa, a commander from his army, to lead the effort to assassinate the king. Aung Zwa led a team of 80 soldiers, and sped down the river by boat without pause. At Pagan, the team infiltrated the palace, and Aung Zwa himself killed the king.

Notes

References

Bibliography
 
 
 
 
 
 
 

Pagan dynasty
1141 births
1174 deaths
12th-century Burmese monarchs